Salsiz is a raw sausage originating in the Grisons. It is an air-dried or smoked sausage and it is produced in many different variants. It distinguishes itself from most other sausages by its rectangular profile.

Pork is used as the basic ingredient. Salsiz are also made with game meat such as deer, chamois or wild boar or with meat from other farm animals such as beef, horse, sheep/lamb. Salsiz is pressed and usually dried without being smoked.

The salsiz is eaten in one piece or sliced together with bread. It is also cooked in a few dishes, notably Capuns and Plain in Pigna, or used as an accompaniment, notably for Maluns. A regional red wine goes well with this, for example from the Bündner Herrschaft.

See also
Swiss sausages and cured meats
Bündnerfleisch, another dried meat product from the region
Landjäger and Salame ticinese, other dried sausages from Switzerland

References

Swiss sausages
Culinary Heritage of Switzerland
Culture of Graubünden